Jim Edward, Maxine, and Bonnie Brown is a 1957 album by the American country music trio, The Browns.

Track listing 
 "Looking Back to See"
 "Draggin' Main Street"
 "My Isle of Golden Dreams"
 "I Guess I'm Crazy"
 "Sky Princess"
 "I'll Hold You in My Heart"
 "How Can It Be Imagination"
 "I Heard the Bluebirds Sing"
 "Don't Use the World Lightly"
 "Table Next to Me"
 "You'll Always Be in My Heart"
 "Just in Time"

Personnel
Jim Ed Brown – vocals
Maxine Brown – vocals
Bonnie Brown – vocals

References

External links
CMT Entry for Jim Edward, Maxine, and Bonnie Brown

The Browns albums
1957 albums
Albums produced by Chet Atkins
RCA Victor albums